Fables from a Mayfly: What I Tell You Three Times Is True is the third full-length album by alternative metal band Fair to Midland. It is the band's major label debut after two self-released albums. Fables from a Mayfly was released on June 12, 2007 with its two singles "Dance of the Manatee" and "Tall Tales Taste Like Sour Grapes" both charting in the U.S. rock charts.

Background
After their independent debut album in late 2001, The Carbon Copy Silver Lining, and their second album, 2004's Inter.funda.stifle, the band toured extensively to promote the albums, building up a fanbase in the Dallas, Texas Deep Ellum music scene. However, attempts to branch out into bigger music scenes, such as Los Angeles, proved futile for the band. A lack of progress, combined with increasing costs of self-funding all of their efforts, and Sudderth and Campbells college aspirations, led the band to contemplate breaking up. Just as the band was seriously discussing a break up, they received a call from Serj Tankian, frontman of American alternative metal band System of a Down. Their albums and live shows had caught his attention, and showed interest in signing them to his vanity label Serjical Strike, on Universal Republic Records. This rejuvenated the band's confidence, and they signed on in April 2006, starting work on a new album shortly after.

Writing and recording
From the start, the band chose to revisit many of the songs from Inter.funda.stifle which they felt could benefit from a professional music producer and bigger production budget. The band chose to work with music producer David Bottrill, who had previously worked on Tool's albums Ænima and Lateralus, and Mudvayne's The End of All Things to Come, to create "a big, epic feel" to the album. Tankian would also be present during the sessions, advising and acting as an executive producer. Bottrill affected the band's songwriting process; while in the past, a single band member would write and present their own songs, and then orchestrate the instruments around it, whereas Botrrill would have them write the songs together. This led to less "dead ends", where singular members would write a song by themselves only to not be on the same page as the rest of the band, resulting in wasted time and material. The band wrote "four or five" of the songs in the studio with Bottrill, including their second single, "Tall Tales Taste Like Sour Grapes", and the rewrite of "A Wolf Descends Upon the Spanish Sahara". The band spend four weeks in pre-production, writing new tracks and polishing ones chosen to rework from Inter.funda.stifle, and took another two and a half months recording the album. Only one to two of the weeks were spent on vocal takes, of which lead vocalist Darroh Sudderth found especially stressful, even losing hair in the process. Overall, the process of making the album took roughly six months.

About half of the songs from their prior independent release, Inter.funda.stifle, were reevaluated and re-recorded in the Fables From a Mayfly sessions :"Dance of the Manatee," "Vice/Versa," "A Seafarer's Knot," "The Walls of Jericho," "Kyla Cries Cologne," "When the Bough Breaks" and "Upgrade^Brigade". The track "Orphan Anthem 86" was originally to be re-recorded for the album as well, but the sessions were deemed "too experimental", and the idea was dropped. The band demoed early versions of the  tracks "Musical Chairs" and "Pour the Coal to'er" during the Fables From a Mayfly sessions, but ultimately left them off the album to fully develop later into songs for their next album, Arrows and Anchors. Another demo, "Proof is a Punchline", would be dropped from the album and not revisited for the future album.

Composition and sound
Even during the recording process, the band felt that they were "still trying to find their sound", although the band often accounted that they were inspired to create an "epic" sound for the album, while working with Bottrill.

Release and promotion
The album's release was delayed a few times, initially scheduled for release in April 2007, before being delayed back to its final date, June 12, 2007. Through the recording process, the band would release a series of "video diary" vides to their Myspace account, documenting the creation process. The band toured extensively throughout 2007 and 2008 in support of the album, performing at major concerts such as Coachella, Rock am Ring, and Rock im Park. They opened for bands such as Rage Against the Machine, Smashing Pumpkins, Queens of the Stone Age, and Muse, and Serj Tankian's solo band. Notably, they even teamed up Tankian at times for a live improvisational version of their song "The Walls of Jericho".

Two versions of the album were released, the "original version", and the "international version". The international version of the album are missing the instrumentals that appear between listed songs, with the exception of "Ozymandius" after "Say When." It also does not feature the pregap hidden track "Tibet". It does, however, feature the original Inter.funda.stifle version of "Orphan Anthem 86" as a bonus track.

Reception

The album has been generally well received by critics. IGN praised the band's ability to create a unique sound, describing that "throughout the album, Fair To Midland seems to defy popular recording technique and songwriting style. Yet, in doing so, they create a sound that is so incredibly mesmerizing that a listener who is well-educated on musical styles will be able to pick out elements of a variety of popular styles" and concluded that it was  "easily a frontrunner for album of the year" in 2007.

Track listing

Personnel

Band
 Darroh Sudderth – vocals
 Cliff Campbell – guitar
 Jon Dicken – bass
 Brett Stowers – drums
 Matt Langley – keys

Additional musicians
Claudio Vena – viola and violin on "Tall Tales Taste Like Sour Grapes" and "Walls of Jericho"

Production
David Bottrill – producer, mix engineer
Serj Tankian – executive producer
David Stephan – assistant producer, Pro Tools
Ian Bodzasi – engineer
Bob Ludwig – mastering
Artwork
James Riches – album art

Chart performance

Album

Singles

References

2007 albums
Fair to Midland albums
Serjical Strike Records albums
Albums produced by David Bottrill
Albums recorded at Metalworks Studios
Art rock albums by American artists